East Main Street Historic District, or variations with Residential or Commercial, may refer to:

 Batesville East Main Historic District, Batesville, AR, listed on the NRHP in Arkansas
 East Main Street Historic District (Bridgeport, Connecticut), listed on the NRHP in Connecticut
 East Main Street-Johnson Street Historic District, Hogansville, GA, listed on the NRHP in Georgia
 East Main Street Residential Historic District (Lumpkin, Georgia), listed on the NRHP in Georgia
 East Main Street Residential District (Marshallville, Georgia), listed on the NRHP in Georgia
 East Main Street Commercial Historic District (Statesboro, Georgia), listed on the NRHP in Georgia
 East Main Street-Glen Miller Park Historic District, Richmond, IN, listed on the NRHP in Indiana
 Upper East Main Street District, Bowling Green, KY, listed on the NRHP in Kentucky
 East Main Street Historic District (Danville, Kentucky), listed on the NRHP in Kentucky
 East Main Street Historic District (Wilmore, Kentucky), listed on the NRHP in Kentucky
 East Main Street Historic District (New Iberia, Louisiana), listed on the NRHP in Louisiana
 East Main Street Historic District (Searsport, Maine), listed on the NRHP in Maine
 East Main-High Street Historic District, Greenfield, MA, listed on the NRHP in Massachusetts
 East Main Street-Cherry Street Historic District, Spencer, MA, listed on the NRHP in Massachusetts
 East Main-Cherry Street Historic District, Spencer, MA, listed on the NRHP in Massachusetts
 East Main Street Historic District (Waltham, Massachusetts), listed on the NRHP in Massachusetts
 East Main Street Historic District (West Point, Mississippi), listed on the NRHP in Mississippi
 East Main Street Residential Historic District (Miles City, Montana), listed on the NRHP in Montana
 East Main Street Historic District (Richfield Springs, New York), listed on the NRHP in New York
 East Main Street Commercial Historic District (Palmyra, New York), listed on the NRHP in New York
 East Main-Mechanic Streets Historic District, Springville, NY, listed on the NRHP in New York
 East Main Street Historic District (Westfield, New York), listed on the NRHP in New York
 East Main Street Historic District (Brevard, North Carolina), listed on the NRHP in North Carolina
 East Main Street Historic District (Forest City, North Carolina), listed on the NRHP in North Carolina
 East Main Street Historic District (Hillsboro, Ohio), listed on the NRHP in Ohio
 East Main Street Historic District (Ravenna, Ohio), listed on the NRHP in Ohio
 East Main Street Historic District (Chesterfield, South Carolina), listed on the NRHP in South Carolina
 East Main Street-Douglass Heights Historic District, Union, SC, listed on the NRHP in South Carolina
 East Main Street and Exchange Street Historic District, Union City, TN, listed on the NRHP in Tennessee
 East Main Street Historic District (Jackson, Tennessee), listed on the NRHP in Tennessee
 East Main Street Historic District (Murfreesboro, Tennessee), listed on the NRHP in Tennessee
 East Main Street Residential Historic District (Cuero, Texas), listed on the NRHP in Texas
 East Main Street Historic District (Pflugerville, Texas), listed on the NRHP in Travis County, Texas
 East Main Street Historic District (Christiansburg, Virginia), listed on the NRHP in Virginia

See also
 Georgetown East Main Street Residential District, Georgetown, KY, listed on the NRHP in Kentucky
Main Street Historic District (disambiguation)
North Main Street Historic District (disambiguation)
South Main Street Historic District (disambiguation)
West Main Street Historic District (disambiguation)